Stejanovci is a village in Serbia. It is situated in the Ruma municipality, in the Srem District, Vojvodina province. The village has a Serb ethnic majority and its population numbering 1,020 people (2002 census).

Name
The name of the town in Serbian is plural.

See also
List of places in Serbia
List of cities, towns and villages in Vojvodina

Populated places in Syrmia